Gary Shillabeer  is a former professional rugby league footballer who played in the 1990s and 2000s.

Playing career

Club career
Gary Shillabeer played for Huddersfield Giants in 1999's Super League IV. Gary Shillabeer made his début for Featherstone Rovers on Sunday 12 February 2006.

Note
Gary's surname is variously spelled as Shillabeer and Shillabear.

References

External links
Stanley Rangers ARLFC - Roll of Honour

Batley Bulldogs players
English rugby league players
Featherstone Rovers players
Huddersfield Giants players
Hunslet R.L.F.C. players
Living people
Place of birth missing (living people)
Rugby league second-rows
Year of birth missing (living people)